McRae Kimathi (born 4 January 1995) is Kenyan racing driver who participates in local and international events. 

Named after Scottish rally driver and 1995 WRC champion Colin McRae, Kimathi made his FIA WRC Championship debut at the Junior WRC 2022 Rally Sweden. Co-driven by Mwangi Kioni, he finished fourth. 

He started rallying in 2016 and has participated in the 2022 European Rally Championship, 2022 Rally de Portugal, 2022 World Rally Championship-3, and 2022 Croatia Rally. 

McRae is the son of former Kenyan rally driver Phineas Kimathi.

References

External links
 McRae Kimathi Profile at eWRC
 McRae Kimathi Profile at Motor Sport Stats

Kenyan racing drivers
1995 births
Living people
Kenyan rally drivers
World Rally Championship drivers